Pisg or PISG may refer to:

pisg (Software) - Perl IRC Statistics Generator
Provisional Institutions of Self-Government established in Kosovo by the United Nations in 2003.